Nikola Žižić (born February 17, 1994) is a Montenegrin professional basketball player for Benicarló of the LEB Plata.

Professional career
During 2016–17 season Žižić played for FMP. On December 17, 2018, he signed for Dynamic VIP PAY.

References

External links
 Eurobasket Profile
 RealGM Profile 
 FIBA Profile
 aba-liga Profile

1994 births
Living people
ABA League players
Basketball League of Serbia players
KK Dynamic players
KK FMP players
KK Metalac Valjevo players
KK Podgorica players
KK Sutjeska players
Montenegrin expatriate basketball people in Serbia
Montenegrin men's basketball players
Shooting guards
Sportspeople from Nikšić